Paloș may refer to the following places in Romania:

Palos, a village in the commune Cața, Brașov County
Paloș (Homorodul Mare), a tributary of the river Homorodul Mare in Harghita and Brașov Counties
Paloș, a tributary of the river Cozd in Brașov County
Paloșu, a tributary of the river Caminca in Bacău County